No Man's Land is a 1918 American silent drama film, directed by Will S. Davis. It stars Bert Lytell, Anna Q. Nilsson, and Charles Arling, and was released on July 8, 1918.

Cast list
 Bert Lytell as Garrett Cope
 Anna Q. Nilsson as Katherine Gresham
 Charles Arling as Henry Miller, otherwise Heinrich Mueller
 Mollie McConnell as Emily Brayton
 Eugene Pallette as Sidney Dundas
 Edward Alexander as Pembroke Van Tuyl
 Sydney Deane

References

External links 
 
 
 

Metro Pictures films
Films directed by Will S. Davis
American silent feature films
American black-and-white films
Silent American drama films
1918 drama films
1918 films
Films based on American novels
1910s English-language films
1910s American films